Sesamia grisescens, the pink sugarcane borer, pink stalk borer, shoot borer, sugarcane borer or ramu shoot borer, is a moth of the family Noctuidae. The species was first described by Warren in 1911. It is found in Papua New Guinea, Seram, the Moluccas and New Britain.

The larvae are a pest on Saccharum officinarum, although they also feed on other plants, including Saccharum robustum, Saccharum spontaneum, Saccharum edule, Pennisetum purpureum and Panicum maximum. First instar larvae mine the inner surface of the leaf sheath before boring into the terminal internodes of the stalk. The gregarious early instars feed on the internode tissue. Later, the larvae migrate to the upper three or four internodes of adjacent undamaged stalks where large tunnels are mined. Several days prior to pupation, the larvae cut large exit holes through the stalk rind and retreat into the tunnel to pupate. There are a total of seven larval instars.

References

Hadeninae
Moths described in 1911